A yard is a measurement of length in the British imperial and US customary systems of measurement, that comprises 3 feet or . 

Yard may also refer to:

Parcels of land 
Yard (land), a land area traditionally adjacent to one or more buildings
Backyard, the property behind a house
Front yard, the property in front of a house
Rail yard, a complex of railroad tracks for railroad cars and locomotives

Places 
Scotland Yard or The Yard, headquarters for London's Metropolitan Police Service
The Yard (adventure playground), a former playground in Minneapolis, Minnesota
Yard Peak, a summit in Utah
Yard, Texas
Yard (Portland, Oregon), an apartment building
The Yard (Hot Springs, Virginia), a historic estate home
Yards, Virginia and West Virginia
The Yards (Washington, D.C.), a development on the Anacostia River waterfront
The Yard (Howard University), a quadrangle on the campus of Howard University in Washington, D.C.
The Yard Theatre, a theatre and music venue in London, England

Other uses 
Yard (sailing), a spar on a traditional sailing ship
YARD (software), a documentation generator for the Ruby programming language
The Yard (2011 TV series)
The Yard (2016 TV series) or The Quad
Yards Brewing Company, a brewery in Philadelphia, Pennsylvania, United States
Megalithic yard, a theoretical unit of prehistoric measurement 
Yard glass, a beer glass about a yard deep
1,000,000,000 or yard

People with the surname 
Douglas Yard, judge of the Family Division of the Court of Queen's Bench of Manitoba
Ernie Yard (1941–2004), Scottish association footballer
Molly Yard (1912–2005), American feminist of the late 20th century
Robert Sterling Yard (1861–1945), American writer, journalist, and wilderness activist

See also 
Barnyard, near a farm's barn
Brickyard, a place where bricks are made or stored
Churchyard, near a church
Courtyard, surrounded by walls
Cubic yard, a unit of volume
Graveyard, cemetery or burial ground
The Longest Yard (disambiguation)
Schoolyard, are for teaching, extracurricular and other activities at a school
Shipyard (disambiguation)
Square yard, a unit of area
Stockyard (disambiguation)
Stableyard, near a stable for horses
Wrecking yard, also known as a scrapyard or junkyard 
Yardie, a Jamaican slang term